Poculina is a genus of fungi in the family Sclerotiniaceae.

References

Sclerotiniaceae